Nagia pseudonatalensis is a species of moth in the family Erebidae. It is found in Tanzania.

References

Nagia
Moths described in 1912
Moths of Africa